Triplophysa robusta is a species of ray-finned fish in the genus Triplophysa.

Footnotes 
 

R
Taxa named by Karl Kessler
Fish described in 1876